Daytona Beach Shores is a city in Volusia County, Florida, United States. The population was 5,179 at the 2020 census.

History
Daytona Beach Shores was first organized in 1960 by local business leaders convinced that a smaller community could provide better services to its residents. The city was incorporated on April 22, 1960.

In the 1970s and the 1980s, the city saw a massive building program. Now about 80 percent of the residents live in high-rise condominiums that stretch along the Atlantic Ocean.

A resort and retirement community built on tourism and the service industry, Daytona Beach Shores has no manufacturing industry, but caters to tourists year-round with miniature golf courses and other types of family entertainment.

Geography

The city of Daytona Beach Shores is located on a barrier island along the Atlantic Ocean. The other side of the island (the west side) is bordered by the Halifax River lagoon, part of the Intracoastal Waterway. The city is bordered on the north by Daytona Beach and on the south by Wilbur-by-the-Sea, and Port Orange. The major highway that serves the city is State Road A1A/Atlantic Avenue.

Daytona Beach Shores has a humid subtropical climate, typical for a city in the southeastern United States. Summers are hot and humid, with highs usually in the 90s and a heat index often exceeding 100 degrees. Thunderstorms are frequent in summer afternoons, and the hot, humid weather can last right through the fall months.  Winters are dry and mild, marked by a constant series of cold fronts and warm-ups.  Temperatures dip into the low 30s and upper 20s on occasion, and freezes are not uncommon. Frost usually occurs a few times a year, but snowfall is very rare. The last time snow flurries fell on the city of Daytona Beach Shores was in December 2007.  Temperatures in spring feature warm afternoons, cool evenings, and far less humidity. This beach-going weather attracts tourists to the beaches, usually by early March.

Law and government
Daytona Beach Shores features a City Manager/Commission form of government. Residents elect a five-member City Commission to four-year terms. The Commission members are elected at large and represent the entire community. The Mayor is also elected, and serves as one of the five Commission members and as chairman of the Commission. The City Manager is selected by the Commission members and is the City's chief administrator. That individual directs staff, carries out policies set by Commission, and provides advice to the Commission members, but does not vote.  Daytona Beach Shores utilizes a department of public safety, which combines police and fire services into one department.

Elected officials

 Mayor – Nancy Miller
 Vice-Mayor - Michael Politis
 Seat 1 Commissioner – Christopher Conomos
 Seat 2 Commissioner – Richard Bryan
 Seat 3 Commissioner - Mel Lindauer
 City Manager (appointed) – Kurt Swartzlander

Federal, state and county representation
Daytona Beach Shores is in the 7th Congressional District. The residents of the 6th district are represented in the United States House of Representatives by Republican Cory Mills.

Daytona Beach Shores is part of Florida Senate District 8, and is represented by Republican Tom Wright.  It is also part of Florida House of Representatives District 28, represented by Republican Tom Leek.

Public safety
Daytona Beach Shores has a public safety department which is responsible for combined fire-rescue as well as law enforcement.  All full-time officers are certified as firefighters, EMTs, and police.

Demographics

As of the census of 2000, there were 4,299 people, 2,423 households, and 1,439 families residing in the city. The population density was 4,722.2 inhabitants per square mile (1,824.0/km2). The racial makeup of the city was 96.58% White, 0.58% African American, 0.16% Native American, 1.72% Asian, 0.12% Pacific Islander, 0.14% from other races, and 0.70% from two or more races. Hispanic or Latino of any race were 1.07% of the population.

There were 2,423 households, out of which 4.1% had children under the age of 18 living with them, 54.5% were married couples living together, 3.6% had a female householder with no husband present, and 40.6% were non-families. 35.2% of all households were made up of individuals, and 19.7% had someone living alone who was 65 years of age or older. The average household size was 1.77 and the average family size was 2.18.

In the city the population was spread out, with 4.3% under the age of 18, 2.4% from 18 to 24, 11.5% from 25 to 44, 32.6% from 45 to 64, and 49.2% who were 65 years of age or older. The median age was 65 years. For every 100 females, there were 90.1 males. For every 100 females age 18 and over, there were 89.5 males.

The median income for a household in the city was $43,796, and the median income for a family was $52,731. Males had a median income of $39,118 versus $24,826 for females. The per capita income for the city was $37,010. About 5.4% of families and 6.8% of the population were below the poverty line, including 6.8% of those under age 18 and 6.0% of those age 65 or over.

Notable people

 Duane Allman, musician
 Gregg Allman, musician

Points of interest
 Dahlia Park
 Fornari Park
 Max Samuely Park
 McElroy Park
 Frank Rendon Park
 Sundown Park
 Sunglow Pier

Images

References

External links

 
 

Populated coastal places in Florida on the Atlantic Ocean
Cities in Volusia County, Florida
Seaside resorts in Florida
Populated places established in 1960
Beaches of Volusia County, Florida
Beaches of Florida
1960 establishments in Florida
Cities in Florida